A list of notable buildings and structures in Burundi:

Bujumbura

Museums and monuments
Burundi Geological Museum
Livingstone-Stanley Monument

Universities and education
Hope Africa University 
University of Burundi

Other
Prince Louis Rwagasore Stadium

Gitega
Burundi Museum of Life 
Burundi National Museum